Daniel Leo Sultan (born 1983) is an Australian alternative rock singer-songwriter and guitarist, actor and author. At the ARIA Music Awards of 2010 he won Best Male Artist and Best Blues & Roots Album for his second album, Get Out While You Can (November 2009). At the 2014 ceremony he won Best Rock Album for Blackbird (April 2014), which had reached number four on the ARIA Albums Chart. In 2017, Sultan's record Killer was nominated for three ARIA awards: Best Male Artist, Best Rock Album, and Best Independent Release. Sultan's debut children's music album Nali & Friends was named Best Children's Album at the ARIA Music Awards of 2019.

Early life
Daniel Leo Sultan was born in 1983.  He spent much of his early life in Fitzroy (a suburb of Melbourne). His father is of Irish descent, a lawyer who once worked for the Aboriginal Legal Service. His mother, Roslyn Sultan, is an Indigenous Australian of the Arrernte and Gurindji people. When Sultan was three, the family visited his mother's ancestral lands in Yuendumu (300 kilometres north-west of Alice Springs) in the Tanami Desert; soon after they returned to Melbourne. When a teenager, his parents separated and he lived with his mother in Cairns for three years.  At seventeen he returned to Fitzroy.
 
Sultan started playing guitar at four and wrote his first song at ten. His mother's friend gave him an "old, clapped-out electric guitar" and, when living in Fitzroy, he began singing at local pubs. In 2000 he met Scott Wilson, a guitarist, at a Williamstown pub's karaoke night and the pair began writing tracks together. Wilson later recalled "What struck me at first was that he could play piano and guitar and he was a great foil for what I was doing... After a while playing together he said, 'Can I sing this one?' I said, 'Do you know the words?'... [he had a] mighty voice. A lot of people can play guitar... Not many can sing like that."

Career

2006–2008: Homemade Biscuits

Sultan released his debut solo album, Homemade Biscuits on 13 March 2006, with most tracks written by Wilson or co-written by Sultan and Wilson. It was produced by Wilson at Flowerpress Studios, Newport, and True Form Services, Spotswood. Other performers on the album were Lazare Agnekis, Neil Gray, Elijah Maiyah, Lochile McKlean and Ben Wicks. He received the financial assistance of John Butler's Seed program.

At the 2007 Deadly Awards, Sultan won the Single Release of the Year for "Your Love Is Like a Song", which was co-written with Wilson. He performed his self-written track, "Roslyn", at the National Sorry Day concert in May 2007, which describes his mother, a member of the stolen generation, removed from her family when she was six or seven.

Sultan and Wilson were invited by Paul Kelly to record a cover version of "This Land Is Mine", originally by singer-songwriter Kev Carmody, for a various artists tribute album of Carmody's work, Cannot Buy My Soul which was released in February 2007. They also performed at two concerts of the same name: the Sydney Festival in January 2008 and Queensland Music Festival in August 2009. In January 2008 Sultan's backing band consisted of Eugene Ball on trumpet, Ben Gillespie on trombone, Joshua Jones on bass guitar, Peter Marin on drums, Ash Naylor on guitar and Gina Woods on keyboards. Sultan and his band have performed at Australian music festivals.

2009–2013: Get Out While You Can

In November 2009, Sultan released his second studio album, Get Out While You Can, which peaked in the ARIA Albums Chart top 100 in late May 2010 – six months after it was issued. It reached No. 1 on the independent Australian charts and was a Triple J feature album. Sultan describes his music as "country soul rock'n'roll". At the ARIA Music Awards of 2010 he won Best Male Artist and Best Blues & Roots Album for Get Out While You Can. In October that year, he also won Best Independent Artist and Best Independent Blues & Roots Album at the Australian Independent Record Awards (AIR Awards).

2014–2018: Blackbird, Dirty Ground and Killer

In February 2014 Sultan supported Bruce Springsteen's Melbourne and Hunter Valley gigs on his Australian tour.

In April 2014, Sultan released his third studio album Blackbird, which reached No. 4 on the ARIA Albums Chart and spent thirteen weeks in the Top 50. At the ARIA Awards in November that year Blackbird won Best Rock Album. Also in November he released his first extended play, Dirty Ground, which reached the ARIA Albums top 100. On 13 November 2015, Sultan released Open Live, a live album recorded at his sold-out National Theatre show of his Blackbird tour.

On 28 July 2017, Sultan's released his fourth studio album Killer, which was produced by Jan Skubiszewski. The album peaked at number 5 on the ARIA charts was nominated for three ARIA awards.

On 19 May 2018, Sultan released his collaborative EP titled Killer Under a Blood Moon which saw Sultan re-record songs from this Killer album with other Australian artists.

In June 2018, Sultan postponed the balance of a national tour after criticism of a live performance and issues with alcohol abuse.

2019–2022: Aviary Takes and Nali & Friends

In March 2019, Sultan released his fifth studio album Aviary Takes, which was preluded with the lead single "Love & Hate" released on 22 February 2019.

In April 2019, Sultan released his sixth studio and first children's album Nali & Friends. Produced by Jan Skubiszewski and released by ABC Music, Nali & Friends debuted at #1 on the Australian iTunes Children's charts, and was named Best Children's Album at the ARIA Music Awards of 2019.

Sultan published his first children's book, Nali (co-written with Rhys Graham), in December 2019.

2023: Signing with UNIFIED and "Story"
On 16 February 2023, it was confirmed that Sultan had signed with UNIFIED management, ahead of new single "Story", set for released on 23 February 2023.

Other projects
Sultan made his screen debut in the 2009 feature film Bran Nue Dae, alongside Geoffrey Rush, Missy Higgins and Jessica Mauboy.

Sultan is a sometime member of Black Arm Band, a loose collection of various indigenous musicians. He was also involved in Paul Kelly's The Merri Soul Sessions project.

Sexual assault allegations
On 28 February 2020, Sultan was charged with indecent assault by Victoria Police over a September 2008 incident in Melbourne. The charges led Sultan to withdraw from performing at the Perth Festival (which he was headlining), the Port Fairy Folk Festival (both scheduled to take place the following week), and the Parrtjima Festival in Alice Springs in April 2020. The charges were dropped by Victorian police and struck out during a hearing in Melbourne Magistrates Court in November 2020.

Discography

Studio albums

Live albums

Extended plays

Singles

As lead artist

As featured artist

Other appearances

Notes

Awards and nominations

AIR Awards
The Australian Independent Record Awards (commonly known informally as AIR Awards) is an annual awards night to recognise, promote and celebrate the success of Australia's Independent Music sector.

|-
| rowspan="3" | AIR Awards of 2010
| himself 
| Best Independent Artist
| 
|-
| rowspan="2" | Get Out While You Can
| Best Independent Album
| 
|-
| Best Independent Blues and Roots Album
| 
|-
| AIR Awards of 2014
| Blackbird
| Best Independent Blues and Roots Album
| 
|-
| AIR Awards of 2017
| "January 26" (with A.B. Original)
| Best Independent Single/EP
| 
|-
| AIR Awards of 2018
|Killer 
| Best Independent Blues and Roots Album
| 
|-
| AIR Awards of 2019
| Killer Under a Blood Moon
| Best Independent Blues and Roots Album
| 
|-

APRA Awards
The APRA Awards are presented annually from 1982 by the Australasian Performing Right Association (APRA), "honouring composers and songwriters".

! 
|-
| 2011 || "Letter" (Dan Sultan, Scott Wilson) || Breakthrough Songwriter of the Year ||  || 
|-
| 2014 
| "Under Your Skin" (Dan Sultan, Alexander Burnett, Pip Norman)
| Song of the Year
| 
| 
|-
| rowspan="3" |2015 
| "Kimberley Calling" (Dan Sultan)
| Song of the Year
| 
| 
|-
| "The Same Man" (Dan Sultan, Pip Norman)
| rowspan="2" | Rock of the Year
| 
| rowspan="2" | 
|-
| "Under Your Skin" (Dan Sultan, Alexander Burnett, Pip Norman)
| 
|-
| 2018 
| "Hold It Together" (Dan Sultan, Alexander Burnett)
| Song of the Year
| 
| 
|-
| 2019
|"Every Day My Mother's Voice" (with Paul Kelly) for The Final Quarter || Best Original Song Composed for the Screen ||  || 
|-
| 2020
| "Every Day My Mother's Voice" (with Paul Kelly)
| Song of the Year
| 
| 
|-
| 2021
| "Gadigal Land" by Midnight Oil featuring Dan Sultan, Joel Davison, Kaleena Briggs & Bunna Lawrie
| Song of the Year
| 
| 
|-

ARIA Music Awards
The ARIA Music Awards is an annual awards ceremony that recognises excellence, innovation, and achievement across all genres of Australian music. Sultan has won 4 awards from 15 nominations.

|-
| rowspan="3"| 2010
| rowspan="3"| Get Out While You Can
| Best Male Artist
| 
|-
| Best Blues & Roots Album
| 
|-
| Best Independent Release
| 
|-
| rowspan="5"| 2014
| rowspan="4"| Blackbird
| Album of the Year
|  
|-
| Best Male Artist
| 
|-
| Best Independent Release
|  
|-
| Best Rock Album
| 
|-
| Blackbird Album Tour
| Best Australian Live Act
| 
|-
| rowspan="3"| 2017
| rowspan="3"| Killer
| Best Male Artist
| 
|-
| Best Rock Album
| 
|-
| Best Independent Release
| 
|-
| rowspan="2"| 2018
| rowspan="2"| Killer Under a Blood Moon
| Best Male Artist
| 
|-
| Best Adult Contemporary Album
| 
|-
| rowspan="2"| 2019
| Aviary Takes
| Best Blues & Roots Album
| 
|-
| Nali & Friends
| Best Children's Album
| 
|-

The Deadly Awards
The Deadly Awards, commonly known simply as The Deadlys, was an annual celebration of Australian Aboriginal and Torres Strait Islander achievement in music, sport, entertainment and community. The ran from 1995 to 2013.

|-
| Deadly Awards 2006
| himself
| Most Promising New Talent
| 
|-
| Deadly Awards 2007
| "Your Love is Like a Song"
| Single of the Year
| 
|-
| rowspan="2"| Deadly Awards 2010
| himself
| Artist of the Year
| 
|-
| "Letter"
| Single of the Year
| 
|-

J Awards
The J Awards are an annual series of Australian music awards that were established by the Australian Broadcasting Corporation's youth-focused radio station Triple J. They commenced in 2005.

|-
| J Awards of 2017
| himself
| Double J Artist of the Year
| 
|-

Music Victoria Awards
The Music Victoria Awards, are an annual awards night celebrating Victorian music. They commenced in 2005 (although nominee and winners are unknown from 2005 to 2012).

|-
| 2013
| himself
| Best Indigenous Act
| 
|-
| rowspan="2"| 2014
| rowspan="2"| Blackbird
| Best Album
| 
|-
| Best Male Artist
| 
|-
| 2015
| himself
| Best Indigenous Act
| 
|-
| rowspan="2"| 2017
| rowspan="2"| himself
| Best Male
| 
|-
| Best Aboriginal Act
| 
|-

National Indigenous Music Awards
The National Indigenous Music Awards recognise excellence, innovation and leadership among Aboriginal and Torres Strait Islander musicians from throughout Australia. They commenced in 2004.

|-
| 2011
| himself
| Act of the Year
| 
|-
| rowspan="5"| 2014
| himself
| Artist of the Year
| 
|-
| rowspan="2"|Blackbird
| Album of the Year
| 
|-
| Cover Art of the Year
| 
|-
| "Under Your Skin"
| Film Clip of the Year
| 
|-
| "The Same Man"
| Song of the Year
| 
|-
| rowspan="3"| 2015
| himself
| Artist of the Year
| 
|-
| rowspan="2"|"Dirty Ground"
| Film Clip of the Year
| 
|-
| Song of the Year
| 
|-
| rowspan="2"| 2016
| himself
| Artist of the Year
| 
|-
| Open LIVE – Live from the National Theatre, Melbourne
| Album of the Year
| 
|-
| rowspan="4"| 2017
| himself
| Artist of the Year
| 
|-
| "Magnetic"
| rowspan="2"| Film Clip of the Year
| 
|-
| rowspan="2"| "January 26" 
| 
|-
| Song of the Year
| 
|-
| rowspan="2"| 2018
| "Kingdom"
| Song of the Year
| 
|-
| Killer
| Album of the Year
| 
|-
| 2019
| Avairy Takes
| Album of the Year
| 
|-

National Live Music Awards
The National Live Music Awards (NLMAs) are a broad recognition of Australia's diverse live industry, celebrating the success of the Australian live scene. The awards commenced in 2016.

|-
|  2017
| Dan Sultan
| Live Blues and Roots Act of the Year
| 
|-
| 2018
| Dan Sultan
| Live Blues and Roots Act of the Year
|

Screen Music Awards

|-
| 2019
| "Every Day My Mother's Voice" 
| Best Original Song Composed for the Screen
| 
|-

South Australian Music Awards
The South Australian Music Awards (previously known as the Fowler's Live Music Awards) are annual awards that exist to recognise, promote and celebrate excellence in the South Australian contemporary music industry. They commenced in 2012.

 
|-
| rowspan="2" | 2017
| rowspan="2" | "January 26" (A.B. Original featuring Dan Sultan)
| Best Song
| 
|- 
| Best Video
| 
|-

References

External links

 
 The Black Arm Band bio

1983 births
Living people
Indigenous Australian musicians
People from Williamstown, Victoria
ARIA Award winners
21st-century Australian singers
21st-century Australian male singers
Australian mandolinists
Arrernte people
Gurindji people